Herbert James Raymer (1874-1956) was the Dean of Nelson from 1933 to 1934.

Raymer was educated at the University of Cambridge and  ordained in 1899. His first post was a  curacy in Ossett. After this he served  as: a missionary priest at St Cyprian, Durban; Secretary of the SPG for Yorkshire; Rector of Pittsworth, Queensland; and Chaplain at All Saints, Kobe. He then held incumbencies in  Skelmanthorpe, Ovenden and Selly Oak until his appointment as Dean. Afterwards he was the Chaplain at Bromley College.

He died on 25 May 1956.

References

1874 births
1956 deaths
Alumni of the University of Cambridge
Deans of Nelson